Jeremy Cox (born August 16, 1996) is an American football running back who is a free agent. He played college football at Old Dominion.

College career
Cox was a member of the Old Dominion Monarchs for four seasons. He finished his collegiate career second in school history with 2,175 rushing yards and fourth with 23 rushing touchdowns on 451 carries and also caught 75 passes for 532 yards and one touchdown.

Professional career

Los Angeles Chargers
Cox was signed by the Los Angeles Chargers as an undrafted free agent on April 28, 2019. He was waived on August 31, 2019, during final roster cuts.

Denver Broncos
Cox was signed to a reserve/futures contract by the Denver Broncos on February 17, 2020. He was waived on September 5, 2020, during final roster cuts and was re-signed to the team's practice squad the following day. Cox was elevated to the active roster and made his NFL debut on October 18, 2020, in an 18–12 win over the New England Patriots before being reverted to the practice squad the following day. He was elevated to the active roster for the team's week 7 game against the Kansas City Chiefs, and reverted to the practice squad again after the game. He was promoted to the active roster on October 31, 2020. Cox was waived on December 11, 2020, and re-signed to the practice squad four days later. On January 4, 2021, Cox signed a reserve/futures contract with the Broncos. He was waived on May 4, 2021.

Arlington Renegades
Cox was assigned to the Arlington Renegades of the XFL on January 6, 2023.

References

External links
Denver Broncos bio
Old Dominion Monarchs bio

1996 births
Living people
People from Hope Mills, North Carolina
Players of American football from North Carolina
American football running backs
Old Dominion Monarchs football players
Los Angeles Chargers players
Denver Broncos players
Arlington Renegades players